Wilson Or Chong-shing, MH (born 9 July 1973) is a Hong Kong politician. He is an executive committee member of the Democratic Alliance for the Betterment and Progress of Hong Kong (DAB), the largest pro-Beijing party. He is a member of Kwun Tong District Council, having represented Kwong Tak since 2000.

Or won a seat on Kwun Tong District Council in 1999, as a member of the Democratic Alliance for the Betterment of Hong Kong (DAB), beating a candidate from the Democratic Party. He retained his seat in 2003 despite the party's negative image following its support for Basic Law Article 23 legislation, receiving the highest votes in the district. He went on to be re-elected in 2007, 2011 and 2015 unopposed.

In 2011, he was elected to the Election Committee, through the Hong Kong and Kowloon District Councils Subsector, which was responsible for selecting the Chief Executive in 2012. In 2013, he joined the DAB's executive committee.

In the 2016 Legislative Council election, he won the seat formerly held by DAB veteran Chan Kam-lam in Kowloon East.  He held his seat in the 2019 District Council elections.

On 14 January 2021, Or was in a video call with the Legislative Council's Panel on Housing, where he was suspected to have been in a car while in the meeting. Or later said he was in the office, but changed his story afterwards and said he was in the car.

References

1973 births
Living people
District councillors of Kwun Tong District
Democratic Alliance for the Betterment and Progress of Hong Kong politicians
Hong Kong Federation of Trade Unions
HK LegCo Members 2016–2021
Members of the Election Committee of Hong Kong, 2012–2017